Boiga quincunciata is a species of cat snake, a rear-fanged colubrid, found in Myanmar (= Burma), India (Assam, Arunachal Pradesh (Chessa, Chimpu, Papum Pare district).

References

 Wall, F. 1908 Two new snakes from Assam. J. Bombay N. H. S. xviii: 272-274

quincunciata
Reptiles described in 1908